The 2023 Purdue Fort Wayne Mastodons baseball team is a baseball team that represents Purdue University Fort Wayne in the 2023 NCAA Division I baseball season. The Mastodons are members of the Horizon League and play their home games at Mastodon Field in Fort Wayne, Indiana. They are led by fourth-year head coach Doug Schreiber.

Previous season
The Mastodons finished the 2022 NCAA Division I baseball season 18–36 overall (13–15 conference) and fourth place in the conference standings, qualifying for the 2022 Horizon League Baseball Tournament, where they were eliminated in the play-in round after going 0–1.

Preseason Horizon poll
For the 2023 poll, Purdue Fort Wayne was projected to finish in sixth in the Conference.

Roster

Schedule

! style="" | Regular Season
|- valign="top"

|- align="center" bgcolor="#ffcccc"
| 1 || February 17 || || at  || Wheeler–Watkins Baseball Complex • Montgomery, Alabama || 0–13 || Melendez (1–0) || Deany (0–1) || None || 457 || 0–1 || –
|- align="center" bgcolor="#ccffcc"
| 2 || February 18 || || at Alabama State || Wheeler–Watkins Baseball Complex • Montgomery, Alabama || 4–3 || Reid (1–0) || Quiles (0–1) || Miller (1) || 65 || 1–1 || –
|- align="center" bgcolor="#ffcccc"
| 3 || February 18 || || at Alabama State || Wheeler–Watkins Baseball Complex • Montgomery, Alabama || 4–18 || Mendez (1–0) || Stills (0–1) || None || 70 || 1–2 || –
|- align="center" bgcolor="#ffcccc"
| 4 || February 19 || || at Alabama State || Wheeler–Watkins Baseball Complex • Montgomery, Alabama || 11–13 || Se. Colon (1–0) || Bauer (0–1) || Sh. Colon (1) || 85 || 1–3 || –
|- align="center" bgcolor="#ffcccc"
| 5 || February 24 || || at  || Jackie Robinson Ballpark • Daytona Beach, Florida || 8–13 || Perez (1–1) || Fine (0–1) || None || 122 || 1–4 || –
|- align="center" bgcolor="#ffcccc"
| 6 || February 25 || || at Bethune–Cookman || Jackie Robinson Ballpark • Daytona Beach, Florida || 5–9 || Santos (1–0) || Myer (0–1) || York (1) || 133 || 1–5 || –
|- align="center" bgcolor="#ffcccc"
| 7 || February 25 || || at Bethune–Cookman || Jackie Robinson Ballpark • Daytona Beach, Florida || 4–7 || Michaud (1–0) || Stills (0–2) || Gonzalez (1) || 161 || 1–6 || –
|- align="center" bgcolor="#ffcccc"
| 8 || February 26 || || at Bethune–Cookman || Jackie Robinson Ballpark • Daytona Beach, Florida || 0–10 || Gaviria (1–0) || Ayres (0–1) || None || 101 || 1–7 || 
|-

|- align="center" bgcolor="#ffcccc"
| 9 || March 3 || || at #2  || David F. Couch Ballpark • Winston-Salem, North Carolina || 0–11 || Lowder (3–0) || Hayden (0–1) || None || 358 || 1–8 || –
|- align="center" bgcolor="#ccffcc"
| 10 || March 4 || || vs  || David F. Couch Ballpark • Winston-Salem, North Carolina || 6–3 || Deany (1–1) || Hamill (0–2) || Fine (1) || 167 || 2–8 || –
|- align="center" bgcolor="#ffcccc"
| 11 || March 4 || || vs  || David F. Couch Ballpark • Winston-Salem, North Carolina || 0–11 || Johnson (2–1) || Stills (0–3) || None || 253 || 2–9 || –
|- align="center" bgcolor="#ffcccc"
| 12 || March 5 || || vs Ball State || David F. Couch Ballpark • Winston-Salem, North Carolina || 9–13 || Weatherly (1–1) || Reid (1–1) || None || 167 || 2–10 || –
|- align="center" bgcolor="#ffcccc"
| 13 || March 8 || || at  || Bart Kaufman Field • Bloomington, Indiana || 1–15 || Bothwell (2–1) || Bauer (0–1) || None || 1,118 || 2–11 || –
|- align="center" bgcolor="#ffcccc"
| 14 || March 10 || || vs  || Charles H. Braun Stadium • Evansville, Indiana || 0–9 || Holt (2–0) || Deany (1–2) || None || 137 || 2–12 || –
|- align="center" bgcolor="#ffcccc"
| 15 || March 10 || || at Austin Peay || Charles H. Braun Stadium • Evansville, Indiana || 5–6 || Robinson (1–1) || Stills (0–4) || Pollard (1) || 137 || 2–13 || –
|- align="center" bgcolor="#ccffcc"
| 16 || March 11 || || at Austin Peay || Charles H. Braun Stadium • Evansville, Indiana || 5–3 || Fee (1–0) || Crawford (0–1) || None || 157 || 3–13 || –
|- align="center" bgcolor="#ffcccc"
| 17 || March 11 || || at Austin Peay || Charles H. Braun Stadium • Evansville, Indiana || 2–4 || Kush (1–1) || Fine (0–3) || Magrans (1) || 157 || 3–14 || –
|- align="center" bgcolor="#cccccc"
| 18 || March 14 || || at Ball State || Ball Diamond • Muncie, Indiana ||colspan=7| Game cancelled
|- align="center" bgcolor=
| 19 || March 17 || || at  || Nischwitz Stadium • Fairborn, Ohio || – || – || – || – || – || – || –
|- align="center" bgcolor=
| 20 || March 18 || || at Wright State || Nischwitz Stadium • Fairborn, Ohio || – || – || – || – || – || – || –
|- align="center" bgcolor=
| 21 || March 19 || || at Wright State || Nischwitz Stadium • Fairborn, Ohio || – || – || – || – || – || – || –
|- align="center" bgcolor=
| 22 || March 21 || || at  || Steller Field • Bowling Green, Ohio || – || – || – || – || – || – || –
|- align="center" bgcolor=
| 23 || March 24 || ||  || Mastodon Field • Fort Wayne, Indiana || – || – || – || – || – || – || –
|- align="center" bgcolor=
| 24 || March 25 || || Northern Kentucky || Mastodon Field • Fort Wayne, Indiana || – || – || – || – || – || – || –
|- align="center" bgcolor=
| 25 || March 26 || || Northern Kentucky || Mastodon Field • Fort Wayne, Indiana || – || – || – || – || – || – || –
|- align="center" bgcolor=
| 26 || March 28 || || Bowling Green || Mastodon Field • Fort Wayne, Indiana || – || – || – || – || – || – || –
|- align="center" bgcolor=
| 27 || March 31 || || at Youngstown State || Eastwood Field • Niles, Ohio || – || – || – || – || – || – || –
|-

|- align="center" bgcolor=
| 28 || April 1 || || at Youngstown State || Eastwood Field • Niles, Ohio || – || – || – || – || – || – || –
|- align="center" bgcolor=
| 29 || April 2 || || at Youngstown State || Eastwood Field • Niles, Ohio || – || – || – || – || – || – || –
|- align="center" bgcolor=
| 30 || April 4 || ||  || Mastodon Field • Fort Wayne, Indiana || – || – || – || – || – || – || –
|- align="center" bgcolor=
| 31 || April 6 || || at  || Oakland Baseball Field • Rochester, Michigan || – || – || – || – || – || – || –
|- align="center" bgcolor=
| 32 || April 7 || || at Oakland || Oakland Baseball Field • Rochester, Michigan || – || – || – || – || – || – || –
|- align="center" bgcolor=
| 33 || April 8 || || at Oakland || Oakland Baseball Field • Rochester, Michigan
|- align="center" bgcolor=
| 34 || April 11 || || at  || Emory G. Bauer Field • Valparaiso, Indiana || – || – || – || – || – || – || –
|- align="center" bgcolor=
| 35 || April 12 || || at Dayton || Woerner Field • Dayton, Ohio || – || – || – || – || – || – || –
|- align="center" bgcolor=
| 36 || April 14 || ||  || Mastodon Field • Fort Wayne, Indiana || – || – || – || – || – || – || –
|- align="center" bgcolor=
| 37 || April 15 || || Milwaukee || Mastodon Field • Fort Wayne, Indiana || – || – || – || – || – || – || –
|- align="center" bgcolor=
| 38 || April 16 || || Milwaukee || Mastodon Field • Fort Wayne, Indiana || – || – || – || – || – || – || –
|- align="center" bgcolor=
| 39 || April 19 || || at Michigan State || Drayton McLane Baseball Stadium at John H. Kobs Field • East Lansing, Michigan || – || – || – || – || – || – || –
|- align="center" bgcolor=
| 40 || April 21 || ||  || Mastodon Field • Fort Wayne, Indiana || – || – || – || – || – || – || –
|- align="center" bgcolor=
| 41 || April 22 || || Wright State || Mastodon Field • Fort Wayne, Indiana || – || – || – || – || – || – || –
|- align="center" bgcolor=
| 42 || April 23 || || Wright State || Mastodon Field • Fort Wayne, Indiana|| – || – || – || – || – || – || –
|- align="center" bgcolor=
| 43 || April 26 || || Dayton ||  Mastodon Field • Fort Wayne, Indiana || – || – || – || – || – || – || –
|- align="center" bgcolor=
| 44 || April 28 || || at Northern Kentucky || Bill Aker Baseball Complex • Highland Heights, Kentucky || – || – || – || – || – || – || –
|- align="center" bgcolor=
| 45 || April 29 || || at Northern Kentucky || Bill Aker Baseball Complex • Highland Heights, Kentucky || – || – || – || – || – || – || –
|- align="center" bgcolor=
| 46 || April 30 || || at Northern Kentucky || Bill Aker Baseball Complex • Highland Heights, Kentucky || – || – || – || – || – || – || –
|-

|- align="center" bgcolor=
| 47 || May 5 || || Youngstown State || Mastodon Field • Fort Wayne, Indiana || – || – || – || – || – || – || –
|- align="center" bgcolor=
| 48 || May 6 || || Youngstown State || Mastodon Field • Fort Wayne, Indiana || – || – || – || – || – || – || –
|- align="center" bgcolor=
| 49 || May 7 || || Youngstown State || Mastodon Field • Fort Wayne, Indiana || – || – || – || – || – || – || –
|- align="center" bgcolor=
| 50 || May 12 || || Oakland || Mastodon Field • Fort Wayne, Indiana || – || – || – || – || – || – || –
|- align="center" bgcolor=
| 51 || May 13 || || Oakland || Mastodon Field • Fort Wayne, Indiana || – || – || – || – || – || – || –
|- align="center" bgcolor=
| 52 || May 14 || || Oakland || Mastodon Field • Fort Wayne, Indiana || – || – || – || – || – || – || –
|- align="center" bgcolor=
| 53 || May 16 || || at Toledo || Scott Park Baseball Complex • Toledo, Ohio || – || – || – || – || – || – || –
|- align="center" bgcolor=
| 54 || May 18 || || at  || Franklin Field • Franklin, Wisconsin || – || – || – || – || – || – || –
|- align="center" bgcolor=
| 55 || May 19 || || at Milwaukee || Franklin Field • Franklin, Wisconsin || – || – || – || – || – || – || –
|- align="center" bgcolor=
| 56 || May 20 || || at Milwaukee || Franklin Field • Franklin, Wisconsin || – || – || – || – || – || – || –
|}
</div></div>
|}

Awards

Horizon League Players of the Week

References

Purdue Fort Wayne
Purdue Fort Wayne Mastodons baseball seasons
Purdue Fort Wayne